The Associated Students of the University of Washington (ASUW) is the Student Government at the University of Washington. It is funded and supported by student fees, and it provides services that directly and indirectly benefit student life. The ASUW consists of over 70 student employees and 500 volunteers, and the organization spends about $1.4 million annually to provide services and activities to the student body.

The ASUW Student Senate was established in 1994 as a division of the Associated Students of the University of Washington. The Student Senate provides a broad-based discussion of issues and acts as the official voice for student opinion. Currently, the ASUW Student Senate has a legislative body of over 150 senators representing a diverse set of interests on and off campus.

The ASUW was incorporated in the State of Washington on April 20, 1906.

Diversity 
ASUW provides funding for programming and advocacy on behalf of issues affecting groups that have faced historical or social discrimination. There are currently eight different commissions that host events relating to educational goals and diversity. For instance, the Latinx Student Commission focuses primarily on promoting awareness and advocacy for the Latinx/Chicanx community, and the Black Student Union focuses primarily on promoting awareness and advocacy for the African American/African community. Every Commission is run by a Director, and the Joint Commissions Committee is a committee for these organizations to coordinate efforts for various combined causes and activities, and is chaired by the Director of Diversity Efforts, a member of the ASUW Board of Directors. The ASUW is often at the forefront of social justice issues that face both previous, current, and future generations of University of Washington students. For example, the ASUW has taken a stand against cultural appropriation through Halloween costumes by releasing a 6-minute public service announcement which drew the attention of major media outlets such as The New York Times. In 1991, the ASUW was one of the first colleges in the nation to create a Gay, Bisexual, and Lesbian Student Commission with over $10,000 in funding to help sponsor events for the community.

Components of ASUW 

The ASUW is composed of a variety of programs and commissions:

Programs & Services 
 Arts & Entertainment
 Bean Basket Store
 Bike Shop
 Elections Administration Committee
 Office of Communications
 Office of Government Relations
 Office of Outreach and Involvement
 Office of Student Health Relations
 Rainy Dawg Radio Station
 Student Senate
 UW Leaders
 Student Food Cooperative
 Sexual Assault and Relationship Violence Advocates
 Office of International Student Advocacy
 Office of Inclusive Design

Commissions 
 American Indian Student Commission
 Asian Student Commission
 Black Student Commission
 Student Disability Commission
 Queer Student Commission
 Middle Eastern Student Commission
 Latinx Student Commission
 Pacific Islander Student Commission
 Gender Equity Commission

Board of Directors
The ASUW Board of Directors changes every school year and consists of 8 elected officials and 3 hired, ex-officio members.

Current Board of Directors (2022-2023) 
 President - Timothy Billing 
 Vice President - Lillian Williamson
 Finance and Budget Director - Mitchell Klein
 Personnel Director - Shaheer Abassi  
 Communications Director - Avery Perreault
 Director of University Affairs - Adrien Chen
 Director of Internal Policy - Brent Seto
 Director of Diversity Efforts - Daniel Tadrous
 Director of Campus Partnerships - Kennedy Patterson
 Director of Programming - Kisa Batool
 Director of Community Relations - Benjamin Roscoe

Accomplishments 
The ASUW works through programming, services, and advocacy to serve the students and improve student life on the UW campus. Annual activities like Fall Fling, a free concert at the beginning of the school year, and Everybody Every Body Fashion Show, a program designed to create dialogue around topics of bodies and identities, are just some of the many events that ASUW hosts each year. The Universal U-PASS, the UW Food Pantry, the University Bookstore, the Daily student newspaper, and many other campus staples were all the created thanks to the work of ASUW. In addition, the ASUW has also had a hand in campus remodeling, scholarships, cultural and ethnic awareness, and so much more.

References 

College and university associations and consortia in the United States
Student organizations established in 1906
University of Washington
Student governments in the United States
1906 establishments in Washington (state)